This is a list of Brazilian television related events from 1969.

Events

Debuts

Television shows

Births
16 January - Daniela Escobar, actress & TV host
6 November - Leona Cavalli, actress

Deaths

See also
1969 in Brazil